IPSO may refer to:

Organisations
 Independent Press Standards Organisation, the press industry regulator in the UK
 International Programme on the State of the Ocean
 Les Intellectuels pour la souveraineté, a group of intellectuals studying and promoting Quebec independence
 IPSO Alliance, promoting the Internet Protocol for what it calls "smart object" communications
 Irish Payment Services Organisation

Other uses
 Ipso (candy), a small drop-style candy sold in Great Britain in the 1970s–1980s
 Ipso, an arene substitution pattern in organic chemistry
 Ipso facto, a Latinate phrase used in law
 Check Point IPSO, an operating system for Nokia IP Security Platforms
 IPSO, a brand of Alliance Laundry Systems

See also
 Ipsos, a global market research firm